Tala is a small town and taluka in Mangaon subdivision of Raigad district of Maharashtra State in India. Tala is 15 km away from Indapur Town which is located on Mumbai-Goa Highway . Tala connected to indapur via National Highway  348 b.Talgad is main attraction of Tala which is one of the important fort in Raigad district. Chandika Mata Temple is located at Marketplace of Tala village. Tala is Marathi translation of word lake, and there were many lakes located in Tala village which is also the reason behind the name Tala.

References

Cities and towns in Raigad district
Talukas in Maharashtra